

Surname 
 Antonio Maceo Grajales (1845–1896), Cuban general
 Sam Maceo and Rosario Maceo, organized crime bosses of Galveston, Texas from the 1920s through the 1940s

Given name 
 Maceo Anderson (1910–2001), American tap dancer
 Maceo Baston (born 1976), American professional basketball player
 Big Maceo Merriweather (1905–1953), American blues pianist and singer
 Maceo Parker (born 1943), American saxophonist
 Maceo Pinkard (1897–1962), American composer, lyricist and music publisher, best known for composing "Sweet Georgia Brown"
 Maceo Rigters (born 1984), Dutch footballer
 Maceo Snipes (born 1909), African-American shot in the back by KKK members for voting in 1946
 A. Maceo Walker (1909–1994), African-American businessman
 Maceo Plex (born 1978), stage name of Eric Estornel, an electronic music DJ and producer

See also
 MaCio Teague (born 1997), American basketball player
 Maseo or Vincent Mason (born 1970) American rapper, one third of hip hop group De La Soul